Her Highness Nawab Qudsia Begum Sahiba, Nawab Begum of Dar ul-Iqbal-i-Bhopal, (1801 – 1881) was the Nawab of Bhopal from 1819 until her abdication in 1837.   

She was born to nawab Ghous Mohammad Khan of Bhopal. In 1817, she married Nazar Mohammad Khan, and became the mother of Sikandar Begum. 

In 1819, she succeeded her father as ruler of Bhopal. 

In 1837, she abdicated in favor of her son-in-law. She continued to influence the affairs of state in Bhopal during the reign of her son-in-law, her daughter, and her granddaughter.

References

1801 births
1881 deaths
Indian monarchs
Muslim monarchs
Begums of Bhopal
19th-century women rulers
19th-century Indian royalty
19th-century Indian Muslims
20th-century Indian Muslims